Sappho Özge Çoban (born 7 September 1994) is a German retired judoka of Turkish descent who competed at international judo competitions. She is a World Junior champion and a three-time European U23 champion, she also competed at the 2019 European Games. Her sister Xenia Çoban is also a judoka, they both lived and trained together in Stuttgart, Sappho works as a police chief in the German city.

Çoban became the first female athlete to be awarded Germany's Junior Athlete of the Year award in 2014 following her 2013 World title.

References

External links
 
 

1994 births
Living people
Sportspeople from Karlsruhe
German female judoka
Judoka at the 2019 European Games
German police officers
German people of Turkish descent